The Bottomline with Boy Abunda was a Philippine current affairs-talk-reality show, hosted by Boy Abunda, which premiered on November 28, 2009, and aired every Saturday night on ABS-CBN.

On May 2, 2020, the show has been temporarily suspended airings due to the temporary closure of ABS-CBN because of the cease and desist order of the National Telecommunications Commission (NTC), following the expiration of the network's 25-year franchise granted in 1995. The show eventually did not go back on-air as Boy Abunda returned to GMA Network on December 15, 2022.

Host
 Boy Abunda

Awards
 2010-2011 PMPC Star Awards for Television's "Best Public Affairs Program" & "Best Public Affairs Program Host" (Boy Abunda)
 Asian Television Awards 2011 (Best Talk Show - Winner) The Bottomline with Boy Abunda
 2013 UPLB Gandingan Awards "Most Development-Oriented Talk show" & "Best Talk show Host" (Boy Abunda)
 2015 PMPC Star Awards for Television's "Best Public Affairs Program"
 2016 PMPC Star Awards for Television's "Best Public Affairs Program" & "Best Public Affairs Program Host" (Boy Abunda)
 2017 UPLB Gandingan Awards "Most Development-Oriented Talk show" & "Best Talk show Host" (Boy Abunda)
 2017 LPU Batangas Golden Laurel Media Awards "Best Public Affairs Program"
 2017 PMPC Star Awards for Television's "Best Public Affairs Program" & "Best Public Affairs Program Host" (Boy Abunda)
 2018 PMPC Star Awards for Television's "Best Public Affairs Program" & "Best Public Affairs Program Host" (Boy Abunda)
 2019 KBP Golden Dove Awards "Best TV Magazine Program" & "Best TV Magazine  Program Host" (Boy Abunda)
 2019 Aral Parangal Awards (Best Public Affairs Program)
 2019 COMGUILD Media Awards "Best Entertainment News Program" & "Best Entertainment News Program Host" (Boy Abunda)
 2019 PMPC Star Awards for Television's "Best Public Affairs Program" & "Best Public Affairs Program Host" (Boy Abunda)
 2019 ALTA Media Awards "Best News Talk Program" & "Best News Talk Program Host" (Boy Abunda)
 2019 Biliran Province State University Media Awards "Best Entertainment News Show" & "Best Entertainment Show Host" (Boy Abunda)
 2020 Gawad Lasallaneta Awards "Most Outstanding Current Affairs Talk Show" & "Most Outstanding Current Affairs Talk Show Host" (Boy Abunda)

See also
List of programs broadcast by ABS-CBN

References

ABS-CBN News and Current Affairs shows
ABS-CBN original programming
Philippine reality television series
Philippine television talk shows
2009 Philippine television series debuts
2020 Philippine television series endings
Filipino-language television shows